The following is a list of flags used in Sierra Leone.

National flag

Government flag

Military flags

Historical flags

Portuguese Rule

British Rule

During The Civil War

See also 

 Flag of Sierra Leone
 Coat of arms of Sierra Leone

References 

Lists and galleries of flags
Flags